Tim Lelito (born July 21, 1989) is a former American football offensive guard. He played college football at Grand Valley State University.

Professional career

New Orleans Saints
On April 29, 2013, he signed with the New Orleans Saints as an undrafted free agent. In the third game of the season, against the Arizona Cardinals, Lelito started at right guard in place of longtime starter Jahri Evans, who had a hamstring injury and missed his first start in 122 games.

Lelito was named back-up center to Jonathan Goodwin for the 2014 season. When Goodwin injured his ankle in week 3 against the Minnesota Vikings he came on as a substitute and, due to the ensuing miscommunication, his first snap missed quarterback Drew Brees for an 18-yard loss but he played the rest of the game without incident as the Saints won 20–9.

Tennessee Titans
On March 22, 2017, Lelito was signed by the Tennessee Titans. He was released by the Titans on September 4, 2017.

Detroit Lions 
On September 26, 2017, Lelito was signed by the Detroit Lions. On October 30, 2017, he was placed on injured reserve with a thigh injury. He was released by the Lions on November 7, 2017.

References

External links
New Orleans Saints bio
Grand Valley State bio

Living people
1989 births
American football offensive guards
Players of American football from Michigan
People from Rochester, Michigan
Grand Valley State Lakers football players
New Orleans Saints players
Tennessee Titans players
Detroit Lions players